Börje Jansson (born 10 November 1942) is a former Grand Prix motorcycle road racer from Sweden. His best years were in 1971 and 1972, when he finished third in the 125cc world championship riding for the Maico factory racing team. He won the 1972 125cc East German Grand Prix, marking the first Grand Prix road racing victory for the German motorcycle manufacturer. Jansson won four Grand Prix races in his career. Jansson is the only rider in history to win a Grand Prix riding the Derbi 250 twin (1972 Austrian Grand Prix at the Salzburgring), out of only two races with the Spanish machine.

Grand Prix motorcycle racing results 
Points system from 1969 onwards:

(key) (Races in bold indicate pole position; races in italics indicate fastest lap)

References 

1942 births
Living people
Sportspeople from Örebro
Swedish motorcycle racers
50cc World Championship riders
125cc World Championship riders
250cc World Championship riders
Isle of Man TT riders